Lieutenant Colonel
Walter Lorrain Brodie  (28 July 1884 – 23 August 1918) was a Scottish recipient of the Victoria Cross, the highest and most prestigious award for gallantry in the face of the enemy that can be awarded to British and Commonwealth forces.

Life
He was born on 28 July 1884 the son of John Wilson Brodie, an Edinburgh chartered accountant, and his wife, Grace Mary Lorrain. The family lived at 13 Belgrave Place in Edinburgh's fashionable West End. At the time of Walter's death they had moved to a nearby house at 23 Belgrave Crescent. He was educated at Edinburgh Academy then at the Royal Military College, Sandhurst.

He appears to have been a career soldier and became a lieutenant in the Highland Light Infantry in 1906. He was an expert in the use of machine-guns.

At the time of his deed which earned the Victoria Cross was 29 years old, and a lieutenant in the 2nd Battalion, The Highland Light Infantry, British Army during the First World War when the following deed took place on 11 November 1914 near Becelaere, Belgium, for which he was awarded the VC:
 Brodie personally killed nine men in the attack. In a letter to his parents the following day he described the event as "a bit of a scrape".

He received the Victoria Cross from King George V in person at Windsor Castle on 17 July 1915.

He later achieved the rank of lieutenant colonel.

Brodie was killed in action near Behagnies, France, on 23 August 1918. He is buried in Bienvillers Military Cemetery in grave XVIII F15.

Freemasonry
He was a Scottish Freemason having been Initiated in Lodge Canongate Kilwinning, No. 2, (Edinburgh) on 7 February, was Passed a Fellow of Craft on 28 February and Raised a Master Mason on 28 March 1906.

Memorials
He is memorialised on his parents' grave in the modern north extension to Dean Cemetery in western Edinburgh. A memorial to Brodie also exists in the New Club on Princes Street of which he was a member.

A pavement memorial was installed at Brodie's home in Belgrave Place around 2020.

References

Further reading
Monuments to Courage
The Great War 1914-1918 Victoria Cross Freemasons
The Register of the Victoria Cross
Scotland's Forgotten Valour
VCs of the First World War - 1914

1880s births
1918 deaths
British World War I recipients of the Victoria Cross
Highland Light Infantry officers
British military personnel killed in World War I
British Army personnel of World War I
Military personnel from Edinburgh
People educated at Edinburgh Academy
British Army recipients of the Victoria Cross
Recipients of the Military Cross
Graduates of the Royal Military College, Sandhurst